No Time for Tears may refer to:

 No Time for Tears (film), 1957 British drama film
 "No Time for Tears" (Nathan Dawe and Little Mix song) (2020)
 "No Time for Tears" (The Enemy song) (2009)